Feathered Dinosaurs of China is a documentary book written and illustrated by Paleoartist, Gregory Wenzel. The book has somewhat of a plot, featuring a possible and theoretical day in the life of Chinese Animals from the Aptian stage in Liaoning.

Plot 
The book tells a day in the life of most fauna of Early Cretaceous Liaoning in China, 124 million BC.

Animals featured 
Unidentified Salamanders (mentioned at the beginning)
Callobatrachus
Unidentified Dragonflies
Jinzhousaurus
Unidentified Beetles (seen being kicked up by the Jinzhousaurus herd members)
Eomaia
Sinornithosaurus
Eosipterus
Dendrorhynchoides
Unidentified Striped Fish (seen dead and being squabbled over by the 2 Pterosaurs)
Confuciusornis
Caudipteryx
Manchurosuchus
Manchurochelys
Unidentified Freshwater Clams (seen on the lake bottom)
Unidentified Snails (mentioned in the lake description)
Unidentified Freshwater Crustaceans (listed in the Dragonfly nymph prey list)
Unidentified Mayfly (nymph)
Unidentified Predatory Fish (seen in the distance, hidden under some Water Lilies)
Protopsephurus
Lycoptera
Hyphalosaurus
Unidentified Cicadas (seen on page 20)
Beipiaosaurus
Sinosauropteryx
Unidentified Lizards
Unidentified Striped Moth (mentioned on page 23)
Microraptor
Psittacosaurus (dead)
Protopteryx
Protarchaeopteryx

External links

Dinosaur books